Gillies is both a Scottish surname and a given name shared by several notable people:

Surname uses

Politicians
 Duncan Gillies (1834–1903), Australian colonial and state politician
 James McPhail Gillies (born 1924), Canadian national politician
 John Gillies (Canadian politician) (1837–1889), Scottish-Canadian state and national politician
 Joseph Alexander Gillies (1849–1921), Canadian state and national politician
 Phil Gillies (born 1954), English-Canadian state politician
 Thomas Gillies (1828–1889), New Zealand provincial and national politician
 William Gillies (1865–1932), Scottish patriot, socialist and politician
 William Gillies (Australian politician) (1868–1928), Australian state politician

Sportspeople
 Clark Gillies (born 1954), Canadian professional ice hockey player, member of the Hockey Hall of Fame
 Colton Gillies (born 1989), Canadian amateur ice hockey player
 Craig Gillies (born 1976), English rugby union player
 Eric Gillies (born 1952), Canadian Olympic ice dancer
 John Gillies (1918–1991), Scottish footballer 
 Matt Gillies (1921–1998), Scottish footballer
 Shawn Gillies (born 1981), Jamaican-Australian cricketer
 Simon Gillies (born before 1987), Australian rugby league player
 Trevor Gillies (born 1979), Canadian professional ice hockey player

Others
Liz Gillies, from VICTORiOUS
 Stuart Gillies (born 1986), Composer of "The Longest Reign" music written for Queen Elizabeth the second
 Anne Lorne Gillies (born 1944), Scottish singer-songwriter, broadcaster, academic and writer
 Ben Gillies (born 1979), Australian musician
 Betty Gillies (1909–1998), American aviator
 Daniel Gillies (born 1976), Canadian-New Zealand actor
 Donald A. Gillies, British philosopher and historian of science and mathematics
 Donald B. Gillies (1928–1975), Canadian mathematician and computer scientist
 Elizabeth Gillies (born 1993), American actress
 Ewen Gillies (born 1825), serial emigrant from St. Kilda, Scotland
 Fiona Gillies (born before 1980), British actress
 Harold Gillies (1882–1960), New Zealand-English physician, "father of plastic surgery"
 Ian Gillies (before 1944–2002), British quiz show champion
 Isabel Gillies (born 1970), American actress
 John Gillies (anaesthetist) (1895-1976) Scottish anaesthetist
 John Gillies (botanist) (1792–1834), Scottish naval surgeon who later became an explorer and botanist
 John Gillies (minister) (1712–1796), a Church of Scotland minister and theological writer
 John Gillies (historian) (1747–1836), Scottish historian and classical scholar
 Kylie Gillies (born 1967), Australian television personality
 Max Gillies (born 1941), Australian actor
 Michael Thomas Gillies (1920–1999), English medical entomologist
 Midge Gillies (born before 1977), British journalist and biographer
 Pamela Gillies (born 1953), Scottish academic
 Robert Gillies (disambiguation)
 Rowan Gillies (born 1971), Australian physician, former president of Médecins Sans Frontières
 Stuart Gillies (born before 1987), English chef
 William George Gillies (1898–1973), Scottish painter
 William S. Gillies (1911–2000), American artist

Places
 Gillies, Ontario, Canada

See also
"Gillies" in an instrumental song by Wolfstone from The Half Tail
Gillie (disambiguation)

Scottish surnames
English-language surnames